Michael J. Gillen (August 5, 1885 – February 1, 1942) was an American politician from New York.

Life
He was born on August 5, 1885, in Brooklyn, the son of John Gillen (1853–1924) and Margaret Nancy (McGrath) Gillen (1860–1944). He attended the public schools. He engaged in the real estate and insurance business. On February 4, 1917, he married Mary Agnes Burke (1894–1963), and they had several children.

Gillen was a member of the New York State Assembly (Kings Co., 3rd D.) in 1926, 1927, 1928, 1929, 1930, 1931, 1932, 1933, 1934, 1935, 1936, 1937, 1938, 1939–40 and 1941–42.

He died on February 1, 1942, in Brooklyn, of a heart attack; and was buried at the Holy Cross Cemetery there.

Sources

External links
 

1885 births
1942 deaths
Politicians from Brooklyn
Democratic Party members of the New York State Assembly
Burials at Holy Cross Cemetery, Brooklyn
20th-century American politicians